Juno also known as folate receptor 4, folate receptor delta or IZUMO1R is a protein that in humans is encoded by the FOLR4 gene. Juno is a member of the folate receptor family and is GPI-anchored to the plasmalemma of the mammalian egg cell that recognizes its sperm-riding counterpart, IZUMO1, and facilitates fertilization. The protein was named after Juno, the Roman goddess of fertility and marriage.

After the initial fertilisation stage, a sudden decrease of Juno from the egg cell surface occurs and Juno becomes virtually undetectable after just 40 minutes. Still, after fertilization via intracytoplasmic sperm injection, the egg cell does not lose cell-surface expression of Juno, which suggests that Juno contributes to the prevention of polyspermy. Mice lacking Juno on the surface of their egg cells are infertile because their egg cells do not fuse with normal sperm, demonstrating Juno's essential role in the fertility of female mice.

Discovery 
Based on a sequence homology search for genes relate to the folate receptor, the gene for folate receptor 4 was first identified in mice and humans in 2000 at the University of Nebraska.

In 2014, the function of  folate receptor 4 was discovered by the researchers of the Wellcome Trust Sanger Institute who also proposed that the protein be renamed as Juno. Juno was initially found in murine oocytes, but its interaction with Izumo was subsequently found in other mammalian species, including humans. Being previously elusive, Juno was discovered nine years after its male counterpart, Izumo1.

3D structure 
The crystal structure of Juno was reported in February 2016 by researchers at Karolinska Institutet, in collaboration with the group at the Wellcome Trust Sanger Institute.

Model organisms 
Model organisms have been used in the study of JUNO function. A conditional knockout mouse line called Izumo1rtm2a(KOMP)Wtsi was generated at the Wellcome Trust Sanger Institute. Male and female animals underwent a standardized phenotypic screen to determine the effects of deletion. Additional screens performed:  - In-depth immunological phenotyping

References 

Animal proteins
Fertility
Mammal female reproductive system